Phillip W Diserio (born December 13, 1959) is an American politician and a former Democratic member of the West Virginia House of Delegates who represented District 2 from his January 23, 2012 appointment by West Virginia Governor Earl Ray Tomblin to fill the vacancy caused by the resignation of Representative Tim Ennis. Diserio was defeated in his 2014 bid for reelection, but was later elected in 2016. In 2022, Diserio was defeated again by Jimmy Willis.

Elections
2012 Diserio was unopposed for the May 8, 2012 Democratic Primary, winning with 3,022 votes, and won the November 6, 2012 General election with 3,440 votes (52.0%) against Republican nominee Lynn Davis.

References

External links
Official page at the West Virginia Legislature

Phil Diserio at Ballotpedia
Phillip W. Diserio at OpenSecrets

1959 births
Living people
Democratic Party members of the West Virginia House of Delegates
Politicians from Wheeling, West Virginia
21st-century American politicians